This is a list of Superfund sites in Nevada designated under the Comprehensive Environmental Response, Compensation, and Liability Act (CERCLA) environmental law.  The CERCLA federal law of 1980 authorized the United States Environmental Protection Agency (EPA) to create a list of polluted locations requiring a long-term response to clean up hazardous material contaminations.   These locations are known as Superfund sites, and are placed on the National Priorities List (NPL).

The NPL guides the EPA in "determining which sites warrant further investigation" for environmental remediation.  As of November 29, 2010, there was one Superfund site on the National Priorities List in Nevada, with no further sites proposed for addition.  No site has yet been removed from the list.

Superfund sites

See also
List of Superfund sites in the United States
List of environmental issues
List of waste types
TOXMAP

References

External links
EPA list of proposed Superfund sites in Nevada
EPA list of current Superfund sites in Nevada
EPA list of Superfund site construction completions in Nevada
EPA list of partially deleted Superfund sites in Nevada
EPA list of deleted Superfund sites in Nevada

Nevada
Superfund